The 2006 China Open was an ATP International Series and WTA Tour Tier II tennis tournament held in Beijing, China.  The men's tournament was held September 11–18, and the women's was held September 18–25

Marcos Baghdatis won his first title of the year, and of his career. Svetlana Kuznetsova won her 2nd title of the year.

Finals

Men's singles

 Marcos Baghdatis defeated  Mario Ančić, 6–4, 6–0

Women's singles

 Svetlana Kuznetsova defeated  Amélie Mauresmo, 6–4, 6–0

Men's doubles

 Mario Ančić /  Mahesh Bhupathi defeated  Michael Berrer /  Kenneth Carlsen, 6–4, 6–3

Women's doubles

 Virginia Ruano Pascual /  Paola Suárez defeated  Anna Chakvetadze /  Elena Vesnina, 6–2, 6–4

External links

2006
2006 ATP Tour
2006 WTA Tour
2006 in Chinese tennis
2006 China Open (tennis)